David J. Bishop (born 31 October 1960), also known by the nickname of "Bish", is a Welsh former dual-code international rugby union and then rugby league footballer. As a scrum-half in rugby union, he made his first-class début for Ebbw Vale where he was outstanding. He then joined Pontypool in 1981, but not long after broke his neck. Despite being told he would never play again, he was back playing for Pontypool within a year. He only gained one cap for Wales – against Australia during the 1984 Australia rugby union tour of Britain and Ireland which Wales lost 28–9. Despite the loss Bishop was the only player to score a try against them.

Bishop had played understudy to fellow scrum-half Terry Holmes, and when Holmes switched codes to rugby league in 1985, many expected Bishop to finally be given his chance to play for Wales permanently. However, during a match versus Newbridge, Chris Jarman received a broken jaw in an off-the ball incident. Jarman brought a private prosecution resulting in Bishop being given a suspended jail sentence and an eleven-month ban by the WRU. The Welsh selectors instead picked Robert Jones of Swansea RFC. Bishop however gained his revenge in 1987-88 when Pontypool defeated Swansea at Pontypool Park in the cup, the highlight of the game being Bishop's penalty in the mud to seal the win, following which Bishop wiggled his rear end to the stand—where the Welsh selectors were sitting.

Despite repeatedly putting in outstanding performances for Pontypool, Bishop was never picked for Wales again, though his case was not helped by several of Bishop's antics off the field. The 1987–1988 season was the most successful in the club's history when they lost only two games all season and Bishop formed a potent partnership with Mark Ring. Finally in 1988 Bishop was lured to rugby league and he signed for Hull Kingston Rovers List of Hull Kingston Rovers players Heritage No 868, and subsequently played for Salford and London Crusaders. He was then part of the Wales rugby league team that won a European Nations Cup and reached the 1995 Rugby League World Cup's semi-finals.

When rugby union became openly professional in 1995, Bishop returned to Pontypool as player-coach. Although Pontypool had been relegated from the top flight of rugby in Wales in 1995. Two highlights during this period were saving Pontypool from relegation from Division 1 with a victory over UWIC and the 16–15 win over Neath RFC in the Welsh Cup in 1999. Pontypool then played Cardiff in the next round of the cup, where they were heavily defeated, but Bishop faced his old adversary Robert Jones for the last time.

References

External links
!Great Britain Statistics at englandrl.co.uk (statistics currently missing due to not having appeared for both Great Britain, and England)

 

1960 births
Living people
Dual-code rugby internationals
Ebbw Vale RFC players
Great Britain national rugby league team players
Hull Kingston Rovers players
London Broncos players
Players of British baseball
Pontypool RFC coaches
Pontypool RFC players
Rugby articles needing expert attention
Rugby league locks
Rugby league players from Cardiff
Rugby union players from Cardiff
Salford Red Devils players
Wales international rugby union players
Wales national rugby league team players
Welsh rugby league players
Welsh rugby union players